Hyperinflation affected the German Papiermark, the currency of the Weimar Republic, between 1921 and 1923, primarily in 1923. It caused considerable internal political instability in the country, the occupation of the Ruhr by France and Belgium, and misery for the general populace.

Background 
To pay for the large costs of the ongoing First World War, Germany suspended the gold standard (the convertibility of its currency to gold) when the war broke out. Unlike France, which imposed its first income tax to pay for the war, German Emperor Wilhelm II and the Reichstag decided unanimously to fund the war entirely by borrowing.

The government believed that it would be able to pay off the debt by winning the war and imposing war reparations on the defeated Allies. This was to be done by annexing resource-rich industrial territory in the west and east and imposing cash payments to Germany, similar to the French indemnity that followed German victory over France in 1870. Thus, the exchange rate of the mark against the US dollar steadily devalued from 4.2 to 7.9 marks per dollar between 1914 and 1918, a preliminary warning to the extreme postwar inflation.

This strategy failed as Germany lost the war, which left the new Weimar Republic saddled with massive war debts that it could not afford, totalling 132 billion gold marks , 1914 exchange rate), later revised under the Young Plan to 112 billion marks (1914 exchange rate). The debt problem was exacerbated by printing money without any economic resources to back it. The demand in the Treaty of Versailles for reparations further accelerated the decline in the value of the mark, with 48 paper marks required to buy a US dollar by late 1919.

Afterwards, German currency was relatively stable at about 90 marks per dollar during the first half of 1921. Because the Western Front of the war had been mostly fought in France and Belgium, Germany came out of the war with most of its industrial infrastructure intact, leaving it in a better position to become the dominant economic force on the European continent after an Allied ultimatum to impose economic sanctions that would force Germany to meet payments.

The first payment was made when it came due in June 1921, and marked the beginning of an increasingly rapid devaluation of the mark, which fell in value to approximately 330 marks per dollar. The total reparations demanded were 132 billion gold marks, but Germany had to pay only 50 billion marks at the time, as the reparations were required to be repaid in hard currency, not the rapidly depreciating Papiermark.

From August 1921, the president of the Reichsbank, Rudolf Havenstein began a strategy of buying foreign currency with marks at any price, without any regards for inflation, and it only increased the speed of the collapse in value of the mark, meaning more and more marks were required to buy the foreign currency that was demanded by the Reparations Commission.

In the first half of 1922, the mark stabilized at about 320 marks per dollar. International reparations conferences were being held. One, in June 1922, was organized by US investment banker J. P. Morgan, Jr. The meetings produced no workable solution, and inflation erupted into hyperinflation, the mark falling to 7,400 marks per US dollar by December 1922. The cost-of-living index was 41 in June 1922 and 685 in December, a nearly 17-fold increase. By the Autumn of 1922, Havenstein's Reichsbank found itself unable to make reparations payments.

The strategy that Havenstein had been using to pay war reparations was the mass printing of bank notes to buy foreign currency, which was then used to pay reparations, but this strategy greatly exacerbated the inflation of the paper mark. Since the mark was, by Autumn of 1922, practically worthless, it was impossible for Havenstein to buy foreign exchange or gold using paper marks. After Germany failed to pay France an installment of reparations on time in late 1922, French and Belgian troops occupied the Ruhr valley, Germany's main industrial region, in January 1923. Reparations were to be paid in goods, such as coal, and the occupation was supposed to ensure reparations payments.

The German government's response was to order a policy of passive resistance in the Ruhr, with workers being told to do nothing which helped the invaders in any way. While this policy, in practice, amounted to a general strike to protest the occupation, the striking workers still had to be given financial support. The government paid these workers by printing more and more banknotes, with Germany soon being swamped with paper money, exacerbating the hyperinflation even further.

Hyperinflation

A loaf of bread in Berlin that cost around 160 Marks at the end of 1922 cost 200,000,000,000 Marks by late 1923.

By November 1923, one US dollar was worth 4,210,500,000,000 German marks.

Stabilization
The hyperinflation crisis led prominent economists and politicians to seek a means to stabilize German currency. In August 1923, an economist, Karl Helfferich, proposed a plan to issue a new currency, the "Roggenmark" ("rye mark"), to be backed by mortgage bonds indexed to the market price of rye grain. The plan was rejected because of the greatly fluctuating price of rye in paper marks.

Agriculture Minister Hans Luther proposed a plan that substituted gold for rye and led to the issuance of the Rentenmark ("mortgage mark"), backed by bonds indexed to the market price of gold. The gold bonds were indexed at the rate of 2,790 gold marks per kilogram of gold, the same as the pre-war gold marks. Rentenmarks were not redeemable in gold but only indexed to the gold bonds. The plan was adopted in monetary reform decrees on October 13–15, 1923. A new bank, the Rentenbank, was set up and controlled by new German Finance Minister Hans Luther.

After November 12, 1923, when Hjalmar Schacht became currency commissioner, Germany's central bank (the Reichsbank) was not allowed to discount any further government Treasury bills, which meant the corresponding issue of paper marks also ceased. The discounting of commercial trade bills was allowed and the amount of Rentenmarks expanded, but the issue was strictly controlled to conform to current commercial and government transactions. The Rentenbank refused credit to the government and to speculators who were not able to borrow Rentenmarks, because Rentenmarks were not legal tender.

On November 16, 1923, the new Rentenmark was introduced to replace the worthless paper marks issued by the Reichsbank. Twelve zeros were cut from prices, and the prices quoted in the new currency remained stable.

When the president of the Reichsbank, Rudolf Havenstein, died on November 20, 1923, Schacht was appointed to replace him. By November 30, 1923, there were 500,000,000 Rentenmarks in circulation, which increased to 1,000,000,000 by January 1, 1924 and to 1,800,000,000 Rentenmarks by July 1924. Meanwhile, the old paper Marks continued in circulation. The total paper marks increased to 1.2 sextillion (1,200,000,000,000,000,000,000) in July 1924 and continued to fall in value to a third of their conversion value in Rentenmarks.

On August 30, 1924, a monetary law permitted the exchange of a 1-trillion paper mark note to a new Reichsmark, worth the same as a Rentenmark. By 1924 one dollar was equivalent to 4.2 Rentenmark.

Revaluation

Eventually, some debts were reinstated to compensate creditors partially for the catastrophic reduction in the value of debts that had been quoted in paper marks before the hyperinflation. A decree of 1925 reinstated some mortgages at 25% of face value in the new currency, effectively 25,000,000,000 times their value in the old paper marks, if they had been held for at least five years. Similarly, some government bonds were reinstated at 2.5% of face value, to be paid after reparations were paid.

Mortgage debt was reinstated at much higher rates than government bonds were. The reinstatement of some debts and a resumption of effective taxation in a still-devastated economy triggered a wave of corporate bankruptcies.

One of the important issues of the stabilization of a hyperinflation is the revaluation. The term normally refers to the raising of the exchange rate of one national currency against other currencies. As well, it can mean revalorization, the restoration of the value of a currency depreciated by inflation. The German government had the choice of a revaluation law to finish the hyperinflation quickly or of allowing sprawling and the political and violent disturbances on the streets. The government argued in detail that the interests of creditors and debtors had to be fair and balanced. Neither the living standard price index nor the share price index was judged as relevant.

The calculation of the conversion relation was considerably judged to the dollar index as well as to the wholesale price index. In principle, the German government followed the line of market-oriented reasoning that the dollar index and the wholesale price index would roughly indicate the true price level in general over the period of high inflation and hyperinflation. In addition, the revaluation was bound on the exchange rate mark and United States dollar to obtain the value of the Goldmark.

Finally, the Law on the Revaluation of Mortgages and other Claims of 16 July 1925 ( or ) included only the ratio of the paper mark to the gold mark for the period from January 1, 1918, to November 30, 1923, and the following days. The galloping inflation thus caused the end of a principle, "a mark is worth a mark", which had been recognized, the nominal value principle.

The law was challenged in the Supreme Court of the German Reich, but its 5th Senate ruled, on November 4, 1925, that the law was constitutional, even according to the Bill of Rights and Duties of Germans (Articles 109, 134, 152 and 153 of the Constitution). The case set a precedent for judicial review in German jurisprudence.

Analysis
The hyperinflation episode in the Weimar Republic in the early 1920s was not the first or even the most severe instance of inflation in history (the Hungarian pengő and Zimbabwean dollar, for example, have been even more inflated). However, it has been the subject of the most scholarly economic analysis and debate. The hyperinflation drew significant interest, as many of the dramatic and unusual economic behaviors now associated with hyperinflation were first documented systematically: exponential increases in prices and interest rates, redenomination of the currency, consumer flight from cash to hard assets and the rapid expansion of industries that produced those assets.

German monetary economics was at that time heavily influenced by Chartalism and the German Historical School, which conditioned the way the hyperinflation was analyzed.

John Maynard Keynes described the situation in The Economic Consequences of the Peace:

It was during then that French and British economic experts began to claim that Germany deliberately destroyed its economy to avoid war reparations, but both governments had conflicting views on how to handle the situation. The French declared that Germany should keep paying reparations, but Britain sought to grant a moratorium to allow financial reconstruction.

Reparations accounted for about a third of the German deficit from 1920 to 1923 and so were cited by the German government as one of the main causes of hyperinflation. Other causes cited included bankers and speculators (particularly foreign). Hyperinflation reached its peak by November 1923 but ended when a new currency (the Rentenmark) was introduced. To make way for the new currency, banks "turned the marks over to junk dealers by the ton" to be recycled as paper.

Firms responded to the crisis by focusing on those elements of their information systems they identified as essential to continuing operations. In the beginning the focus was on adjusting sales and procurement arrangements, modifications to financial reporting, and the use of more nonmonetary information in internal reporting. With the continuous acceleration of inflation, human resources were redeployed to the most critical corporate functions, in particular those involved in the remuneration of labor. There is evidence that some parts of corporate accounting systems fell into disrepair, but there was also innovation.

Aftermath and legacy

Since the hyperinflation, German monetary policy has retained a central concern with the maintenance of a sound currency, a concern that had an effect on the European sovereign debt crisis. According to one study, many Germans conflate hyperinflation in the Weimar Republic with the Great Depression, seeing the two separate events as one big economic crisis that encompassed both rapidly rising prices and mass unemployment.

The hyperinflated, worthless marks became widely collected abroad. The Los Angeles Times estimated in 1924 that more of the decommissioned notes were spread about the US than existed in Germany.

Causes
The cause of the immense acceleration of prices seemed unclear and unpredictable to those who lived through it, but in retrospect, it was relatively simple. The Treaty of Versailles imposed a huge debt on Germany that could be paid only in gold or foreign currency. With its gold depleted, the German government attempted to buy foreign currency with German currency, equivalent to selling German currency in exchange for payment in foreign currency, but the resulting increase in the supply of German marks on the market caused the German mark to fall rapidly in value, which greatly increased the number of marks needed to buy more foreign currency.

That caused German prices of goods to rise rapidly, increasing the cost of operating the German government, which could not be financed by raising taxes because those taxes would be payable in the ever-falling German currency. The resulting deficit was financed by some combination of issuing bonds and simply creating more money, both increasing the supply of German mark-denominated financial assets on the market and so further reducing the currency's price. When the German people realized that their money was rapidly losing value, they tried to spend it quickly. That increased monetary velocity caused an ever-faster increase in prices, creating a vicious cycle.

The government and the banks had two unacceptable alternatives. If they stopped inflation, there would be immediate bankruptcies, unemployment, strikes, hunger, violence, collapse of civil order, insurrection and possibly even revolution. If they continued the inflation, they would default on their foreign debt.

However, attempting to avoid both unemployment and insolvency ultimately failed when Germany had both.

See also 

 Andreas Hermes
 Zero stroke

Citations

General and cited sources 

 
 
 
 Costantino Bresciani-Turroni, The Economics of Inflation (English transl.), Northampton, England: Augustus Kelly Publishers, 1937, on the German 1919-1923 inflation. 
 
 
 
 
 
 Guttmann, William. The Great Inflation. Saxon House (1975 hardback w/ sources) or Gordon & Cremonesi Ltd. Publ., London (1976 paperback w/o sources). Germany currency hyperinflation 1919-1923.
 When Money Buys Little - Jerry Jensen Study of the 1923 German postage stamps
 Karsten Laursen and Jorgen Pedersen, The German Inflation, North-Holland Publishing Co., Amsterdam, 1964.

External links 
 

1910s economic history
1920s economic history
1923 in economics
1923 in Germany
Economic history of Germany
Economy of the Weimar Republic
Inflation in Germany
Man-made disasters in Germany
1923 disasters in Germany 
1920s disasters  in Germany